The Ebridea is a group of phagotrophic flagellate eukaryotes present in marine coastal plankton communities worldwide. Ebria tripartita is one of two (possibly four) described extant species in the Ebridea.
Members of this group are named for their idiosyncratic method of movement (ebrius, "drunk").

Ebriids are usually encountered in low abundance and have a peculiar combination of ultrastructural characters including a large nucleus with permanently condensed chromosomes and an internal skeleton composed of siliceous rods.

The taxonomic history of the group has been tumultuous and has included a variety of affiliations, such as silicoflagellates, dinoflagellates, 'radiolarians' and 'neomonads'. However, molecular phylogenies place them within Cercozoa.

Taxonomy
Order Ebriales
 Family †Ammodochiaceae Deflandre 1950 [Ammodochiidae]
 Genus †Ammodochium Hovasse 1932 [Tripodium Hovasse 1932]
 Family †Ditripodiaceae Deflandre 1951 [Ditripodiidae]
 Genus †Ditripodium Hovasse 1932
 Genus †Parathranium Hovasse 1932 [Dicladia Ehrenberg 1845]
 Genus †Thranium Hovasse 1932
 Family Ebriaceae Lemmermann 1901 [Ebriidae Poche 1913]
 Genus †Ebrinula Deflandre 1950
 Genus Parebria Hovasse 1932
 Genus Ebria Borgert 1891 [†Ebriella Deflandre 1934b; †Parammodochium Deflandre 1932; †Proebria Hovasse 1943]
 Family Hermisinaceae Hovasse 1943 [Ebriopsidaceae Deflandre 1650; Hermisinidae; Podamphoraceae Dangeard 1942]
 Genus †Craniopsis Hovasse 1932 ex Frenguelli 1940
 Genus †Ebriopsis Hovasse 1932
 Genus †Falsebria Deflandre 1950
 Genus †Haplohermesinum Hovasse 1943
 Genus †Hermesinella Deflandre 1934
 Genus †Hermesinopsis  Deflandre 1934
 Genus †Hovassebria Deflandre 1936 [Hovassebria Deflandre 1934 nomen nudum]
 Genus †Micromarsupium Deflandre 1934
 Genus †Parebriopsis Hovasse 1932
 Genus †Podamphora Gemeinhardt 1931 [Podium Hovasse 1932]
 Genus †Podamphoropsis Dumitrica 1973
 Genus †Polyebriopsis Hovasse 1932
 Genus †Pseudammodochium Hovasse 1932
 Genus †Pseudomicromarsupium Busen & Wise 1977
 Genus †Semantebria Frenguelli 1940
 Genus †Spyrebria Frenguelli 1940
 Genus Hermesinum Zacharias 1906 [Bosporella Hovasse 1931]

References

Filosa